"Mein Hirt ist Gott der Herr" (My shepherd is God the Lord) is a Christian hymn with German text by Caspar Ulenberg who paraphrased Psalm 23 in 1582. Based on his melody, Johannes Hatzfeld wrote a melody in 1948.

History 
Caspar Ulenberg paraphrased Psalm 23 (The Lord is my shepherd) in 1582. In the Catholic hymnal Gotteslob, it is GL 421, in the section "Leben in Gott - Vertrauen und Trost" (Life in God – trust and consolation). The song is in four stanzas in bar form. it is part of several hymnals.

References

External links 
 

Christian hymns
1582 songs